Thomas Klein-Impelmann is a West German slalom canoeist who competed in the 1980s. He won a gold medal in the C-2 event at the 1985 ICF Canoe Slalom World Championships in Augsburg.

References

German male canoeists
Living people
Year of birth missing (living people)
Place of birth missing (living people)
Medalists at the ICF Canoe Slalom World Championships